Ryan Izzo (born December 21, 1995) is an American football tight end for the Philadelphia Stars of the United States Football League (USFL). He played college football at Florida State, and was drafted by the New England Patriots in the 2018 NFL Draft.

Early years
Izzo grew up in the Highland Lakes of Vernon Township, New Jersey and attended Pope John XXIII Regional High School in Sparta, New Jersey. Izzo began his high school career at Vernon Township High School, where he anticipated playing tight end but ended up playing quarterback. He transferred to football powerhouse Pope John to play tight end.

Initially, he drew little attention from NCAA Division I football programs until Virginia Tech expressed interest and 20 other schools followed thereafter before he graduated in 2014. As a senior, he tallied 766 receiving yards and seven touchdowns. Along with football, he also played basketball. Izzo committed to play college football for the Florida State Seminoles on September 23, 2013.

College career
As a redshirt freshman in 2015, Izzo played in all 13 of Florida State's games, catching 14 passes for 210 yards and two touchdowns. He also rushed for 146 yards and one touchdown on 12 attempts.

In 2016, Izzo once again played in all 13 games, catching 19 passes for 227 yards, tallying one touchdown.

Prior to the 2017 season, Izzo was named to the John Mackey Award watch list. As a redshirt junior, he played and started in all 13 games for Florida State, having 19 receptions for 306 yards and three touchdowns.

After the season, Izzo declared for the 2018 NFL Draft.

Professional career

New England Patriots
Izzo was drafted by the New England Patriots in the seventh round (250th overall) of the 2018 NFL Draft. On September 2, 2018, He was placed on injured reserve. Without Izzo, the Patriots reached Super Bowl LIII where they defeated the Los Angeles Rams 13–3. 

He made his NFL debut and had a three-yard reception in the Patriots' 2019 season-opening 33–3 victory over the Pittsburgh Steelers. Izzo became the 73rd different player to catch a touchdown pass from Tom Brady, scoring on a 10-yard play in the Patriots' week 5 33–7 victory over the Washington Redskins. Izzo missed multiple games in 2019 because of illness and various injuries including a concussion.

Izzo entered the 2020 season as the Patriots starting tight end. He started the first 12 games before being placed on injured reserve on December 10, 2020.

Houston Texans
On March 18, 2021, Izzo was traded to the Houston Texans for a seventh round pick in the 2022 NFL Draft. He was waived on August 31, 2021.

New York Giants
On September 3, 2021, Izzo signed with the New York Giants practice squad. On September 21, 2021, Izzo was released from the practice squad.

Seattle Seahawks
On September 29, 2021, Izzo was signed to the Seattle Seahawks practice squad.

Tennessee Titans
On January 5, 2022, Izzo was signed by the Tennessee Titans off the Seahawks practice squad. He was released on June 1, 2022.

Carolina Panthers
On August 11, 2022, Izzo signed with the Carolina Panthers. He was waived on August 17, 2022.

Philadelphia Stars
On January 5, 2023, Izzo signed with the Philadelphia Stars of the United States Football League (USFL).

References

External links
New England Patriots bio
Florida State Seminoles bio

1995 births
Living people
American football tight ends
Carolina Panthers players
Florida State Seminoles football players
Houston Texans players
New England Patriots players
New York Giants players
People from Vernon Township, New Jersey
Philadelphia Stars (2022) players
Players of American football from New Jersey
Pope John XXIII Regional High School alumni
Seattle Seahawks players
Sportspeople from Sussex County, New Jersey
Tennessee Titans players